Susan Huang may refer to:

Huang Qishan (born 1968), Chinese recording artist and musician also known as Susan Huang 
Susan S. Huang, medical researcher specialising in infection prevention